St. John's in the Wilderness, located about one mile from Sandyfield, was a settlement in the town of Haverstraw in Rockland County, New York, United States.

History
St. John's in the Wilderness was once was a thriving mission established in 1880. It is the only private land within Harriman State Park.

Further reading
Zimmerman, Linda. Rockland County: Century of History

Hamlets in Rockland County, New York
Hamlets in New York (state)
Populated places established in 1880
1880 establishments in New York (state)
Former populated places in Rockland County, New York